Acharya Tulsi setu also known as Jaipur elevated road is an elevated road in the city of Jaipur, in the state of Rajasthan in India.

References

Transport in Jaipur
Roads in Rajasthan